Lycodon capucinus, also known as the Oriental wolf snake, is a species of colubrid snake, which is commonly found in the Indo-Australian Archipelago. Named after their enlarged front teeth, which gives them a muzzled appearance similar to canines, it also makes the snout somewhat more squarish than other snakes.

Description

A slender-bodied small snake that ranges from barely three feet to less than one meter. Most wild-caught specimens usually reach less than these lengths. Coloration is adapted for life underground and on the forest floor. Shades of jet black, reddish-brown or dark gray with speckles, blotches and spots of white or pale yellow scattered over the body are its usual colors. There is also a distinct white coloration around its neck. Their color patterns vary from one geographic location to another. There are albino-colored ones which are very rare among this snake species. The snout is duck-bill-shaped for digging in soft or sandy ground. They have enlarged front teeth, but these are not used to inject venom. Like many other colubrids, they possess true fangs near the rear of their mouths and they will use these to inject venom into their prey. However, this species is relatively benign (not harmful) to humans.

Distribution

The common wolf snake is found in Cambodia, Thailand, Vietnam, Singapore, Laos, SE China, Hong Kong, Indonesia  (Sumatra, Java, Bali, Sumbawa, Sumba, Komodo, Flores, Lomblen, Alor, Sawu, Roti, Timor, Wetar, Babar Islands, Kalao, Salajar, Buton, Sulawesi), West Malaysia, Johor: Pulau Besar, Maldives, Mascarenes (Mauritius, Reunion; fide Glaw, pers. comm.), Borneo, and The Philippines (Bantayan, Bohol, Cebu, Cuyo, Leyte, Luzon, Pampanga, Masbate, Mindanao, Mindoro, Negros, Palawan, Panay, Romblon, Samar).

Behavior

Though the wolf snake is venomous, this venom is relatively mild. Even when they do bite humans, the impact is usually not harmful. Most bites result in pain and swelling, and do not result in any serious harm.
It is quite a nervous snake when picked up or handled and will not hesitate to bite. They may also move their tails in a to-and-fro motion much like a rattlesnake when they feel threatened. A fossorial animal, it loves burrowing down the earth but is most often found in open ground, on rocks or in low vegetation. Sometimes showing a semi-arboreal behavior. A nocturnal creature, it is most active during the night, but is also observed during daybreak.It also climbs on walls of any building. Most captive specimens become tame after some time and with proper handling.

Diet

In the wild, Lycodon capucinus feeds mainly on small lizards such as geckos and they are also among the top predators of skinks which makes it common to humans due to the abundance of prey near and in homes. They may also devour small frogs, if available. In captivity, they may be trained to feed on slender fishes such as goby or lizard-scented pinkie mice, though the latter proves to be harder.

Conservation status

The IUCN listed this species as of 'Least Concern.' Though a very common snake, it is seldom seen. Continuous destruction of primary and secondary forests, conversion of fertile lands to agricultural and residential areas as well as indiscriminate human killings can threaten the survival of this animal. It is endangered in numerous parts of mainland Asia and peninsular Southeast Asia.

References

 Daltry, J.C. & Wüster, W. 2002 A new species of Wolf Snake (Serpentes: Colubrida, Lycodon) from the Cardamom Mountains, Southwestern Cambodia. Herpetologica 58 (4): 498-504
 Das, I. 1999 Biogeography of the amphibians and reptiles of the Andaman and Nicobar Islands, India. In: Ota, H. (ed) Tropical Island herpetofauna.., Elsevier, pp. 43–77
 Daudin, F. M. 1803 Histoire Naturelle Generale et Particuliere des Reptiles. Vol. 6. F. Dufart, Paris.
 Fritts, T.H. 1993 The Common Wolf Snake, Lycodon aulicus capucinus, a Recent Colonist of Christmas Island in the Indian Ocean Wildlife Res 20 (2): 261-266
 Kuch, U. and J. A. McGuire 2004 Range extensions of Lycodon capucinus Boie, 1827 in eastern Indonesia. Herpetozoa 17 (3/4): 191-193

External links
 
 Common Wolf Snake

capucinus
Reptiles of Brunei
Reptiles of Myanmar
Reptiles of Cambodia
Reptiles of China
Reptiles of India
Reptiles of Indonesia
Reptiles of Laos
Reptiles of Malaysia
Reptiles of Singapore
Reptiles of Vietnam
Reptiles described in 1827
Snakes of China
Snakes of Vietnam
Snakes of Asia
Reptiles of Borneo